1980 is a calendar year. 

1980 may also refer to:

Music
 1980 (album), a 1980 album by Gil Scott-Heron
 The title track to the album above
 "1980" (song), a 2004 song by Estelle
 "1980", a 1979 song by Herb Alpert from the album, Rise
 "1980", a 2004 song by Pascal Obispo and Melissa Mars from the album, Les Fleurs du bien
 "1980", a 2007 song by Dirt Nasty from the album, Dirt Nasty
 "1980", a 2008 song by O.S.T.R. from the album, Ja tu tylko sprzątam
 "1980", a 2008 song by Rehab
 "1980", a 2016 song by Reks from the album, The Greatest X
 "Nineteen Eighty", a 2020 song by Joe Satriani from the album, Shapeshifting